Jack Robinson (born December 27, 1997) is an Australian professional surfer who competes on the World Surf League Men's Championship Tour. He was crowned surfer of the year twice at the Australian Surfing Awards in 2020 and 2021. Robinson is often considered to one of the best barrel riders of the current days. Robinson did his best WSL performance in 2022 where he finished 3th on the final rankings.

Early years and personal life 
Robinson was born in December 1997 in Perth, Western Australia to parents Mersina Stratos and Trevor Robinson. He began surfing at age three. By the age of six, he moved with his family to Margaret River, Western Australia. 

By age 11, Robinson was surfing Pipeline in Hawaii at the Second-Reef at eight-to-10 foot. In 2010, Robinson was featured on the cover of “The Weekend Australian Magazine” and was described as a potential future "Kelly Slater".

In 2020, he married Julia Muniz, a Brazilian professional model from Espirito Santo, Brazil, in an intimate garden ceremony held in Margaret River.

Surfing career 
In 2012, by age 14, Robinson ranked #1 on Surfer Magazine’s annual Hot 100 junior list. Robinson won the North Shore Surf Shop Pro Junior in 2014 at the Men's Junior Tour. The same year, he signed a contract with Billabong that lasted for 5 years till he signed with Volcom in 2019.

In 2018, Robinson won the WSL Qualifying Series Men’s Heroes de Mayo Iquique Pro in Chile. In February 2019, Robinson won the 2019 Volcom Pipe Pro.

Robinson received a wild card at the 2019 Margaret river pro event held between 29 May to 4 June 2019 where he secured a 9.30 and 9.27 combo to defeat Brazilian surfer Filipe Toledo.

In December 2019, Robinson won the Vans World Cup of Surfing at Sunset Beach at the final event of the Qualifying Series Men’s and qualified for the 2020 World Surf League (WSL) Men's Championship Tour (CT). 

Robinson won his first Championship Tour event in 2021 at the Corona Open Mexico event presented by Quiksilver. 

Robinson won his second and third Championship Tour event back to back in 2022 at his hometown event in the Margaret River Pro in Australia followed by a victory at G-Land, Banyuwangi (Indonesia).

Career Victories

References

External links 

 World Surf League profile

1997 births
Living people
Australian surfers
World Surf League surfers
People from Margaret River, Western Australia
Sportsmen from Western Australia